Vanimo is the capital of Sandaun Province (West Sepik) in north-westernmost Papua New Guinea and of Vanimo-Green River District. It is located on a peninsula close to the border with Indonesia, nearest to Jayapura, the capital city of Papua (province).

Religion 
Its Holy Cross Pro-Cathedral is the episcopal see of the Roman Catholic Diocese of Vanimo.

Economy and transportation 
Vanimo is a small township with an economy based around the timber industry. Logging company Vanimo Forest Products, which is owned by Malaysian company Rimbunan Hijau, is the chief employer.

There is an airport in Vanimo, Vanimo Airport.

Sports and recreation 
Vanimo is known as a surfing destination. It has a reputation of having the most consistent waves in Papua New Guinea. Surfing season is mid October through to late April.

Vanimo also is a popular destination for foreign workers in Papua/Indonesia who need to leave the country in order to renew their visas. In this case they come over for a day to visit the Indonesian consulate, stay in one of the hotels along the "sundaun-road" and head back to the border 24 hours later.

The boardriders' club at Lido Village were the subject of a report on Australia's Dateline current affairs program.

Climate
Vanimo has a tropical rainforest climate (Köppen Af). It has very warm to hot and wet weather year round.

See also
Vanimo Coast languages
Vanimo language

References 

Populated places in Sandaun Province
Provincial capitals in Papua New Guinea